The 1910 Ohio Green and White football team represented Ohio University  as an independent during the 1910 college football season. Led by second-year head coach Robert Wood, the Green and White compiled a record of 0–6–1.

Schedule

References

Ohio
Ohio Bobcats football seasons
College football winless seasons
Ohio Green and White football